Rugilus is a genus of rove beetles. It is one of the major genera of the subfamily Paederinae.

Species 
Selection of species:
Rugilus orbiculatus
Rugilus rufipes

References

External links 
 iNaturalist

Staphylinidae genera
Paederinae
Taxa named by George Samouelle